Yangcheng may refer to the following locations in China:

Yangcheng County (阳城县), Jincheng, Shanxi
Yangcheng Lake (阳澄湖), in Suzhou
Yangcheng, Qingyuan County, Hebei (阳城镇), town
Yangcheng, Ruicheng County (阳城镇), town in Shanxi
Yangcheng, Yangshan County (阳城镇), town in Guangdong
Yangcheng (historical city) (阳城), close to Dengfeng in Henan
Guangzhou, formerly named Yangcheng (羊城)